Frist Campus Center is a focal point of social life at Princeton University. The campus center is a combination of the former Palmer Physics Lab, and a modern addition completed in 2001. It was endowed with money from the fortune the Frist family has made in the private hospital business.

Designed by Venturi, Scott Brown & Associates, the firm of acclaimed architects Robert Venturi (a Princeton alumnus) and Denise Scott Brown, the building consists of a modern expansion to the existing Collegiate Gothic Palmer Hall. The new building volume fills in the courtyard of the previous C-shaped structure, and extends across its open side to create a new east facade.  In 2008 and 2009 extensive renovations were performed on the 100 level by James Bradberry Architects

Room 302 is a lecture hall restored to its condition at the time that Albert Einstein lectured there.

This building has also been used for external shots of the fictitious Princeton-Plainsboro Teaching Hospital in the television series House.

References

External links

 Daily Princetonian
 Frist Campus Center

1909 establishments in New Jersey
2000 establishments in New Jersey
Princeton University buildings
Robert Venturi buildings
House (TV series)
Frist family